Mrs. Winslow's Soothing Syrup was a patent medicine supposedly compounded by Mrs. Charlotte N. Winslow, and first marketed by her son-in-law Jeremiah Curtis and Benjamin A. Perkins of Bangor, Maine, USA in 1845.  The formula consisted of morphine sulphate (65 mg per fluid ounce), sodium carbonate, spirits foeniculi, and aqua ammonia. It was claimed that it was "likely to sooth any human or animal", and it effectively quieted restless infants and small children especially for teething. It was widely marketed in the UK and the US. As well as newspapers, the company used various media to promote its product, including recipe books, calendars, and trade cards.

In 1911 the American Medical Association issued a publication titled "Nostrums And Quackery" in which, in a section called "Baby Killers", it incriminated Mrs. Winslow's Soothing Syrup. The product was nevertheless not withdrawn from sale until 1930.

In 1879 the English composer Edward Elgar wrote an early musical work, part of his Harmony Music for a wind quintet, which he titled Mrs. Winslow's soothing syrup.

In Woody Guthrie's 1940 Dustbowl Ballad, "Tom Joad", Grandpa Joad is given soothing syrup before he dies.

See also
United States v. Johnson (1911)

References

Further reading

Wingfield, Erin.  Snake Oil and Magic Potions:  Fooling the Public with Cure-alls and Quackery.  Curator's Choice.  http://www.jefpat.org/CuratorsChoiceArchive/2014CuratorsChoice/Apr2014-Snake%20Oil%20and%20Magic%20Potions-.html

Patent medicines